Helmut Gritscher (6 June 1933 - 24 November 2015) was an Austrian-born skier, ski instructor and photographer who worked in Australia 1961–70.

Biography 
Helmut Gritscher was born 7 June 1933 in Wattens, in the Austrian Tyrol. A ski instructor, he traveled and worked in the mountains of Europe, Lebanon and the United States before coming to Australia in 1961 to join the Perisher Ski School in the Mt. Kosciusko ski fields, producing his first book, Skiing, on ski technique, with fellow instructor Fritz Halbwidl.

Photographer 
Gritscher stayed in Australia because he "wanted to photograph something which has only been partly explored visually" to produce his second book The High Country, on the Australian Alps photographed in winter and summer, for which he asked Craig McGregor to write the text. Of the process of taking the photographs he remembered, "with every day I spent in those mountains I discovered more beautiful things, and my life became richer, sentiments on which he elaborated in interview; 

His subjects in the Alps included not only skiers and the landscape, but also the Snowy Mountains hydroelectric project.

To Sydney with Love, his third book, took as its subject Sydney's beaches and harbour, and there he also photographed the older suburbs, rugby, the Sydney Opera House and cultural events.

Gristcher's photographs were published frequently to illustrate articles and covers for Walkabout magazine and also in Pacific Islands Monthly, and he was profiled in Craig McGregor's 1969 survey of Australian arts In The Making

Returning to Europe in 1970, Gritscher continued to produce illustrations there for ski stories. and he was represented by Aspect picture library, London, which distributed his photographs to publishers including Life books, Reader's Digest and National Geographic into the 1990s

Gritscher died, aged 82, on 24 November 2015 in Austria in his home town of Wattens where his ashes are interred, and was survived by his wife Gerda, sons Thomas and Andreas and siblings Paula and Herbert.

Reception and recognition 
Peter Fenton, in reviewing The High Country for The Age writes that "Gritscher's camera work which dominates 'The High Country' and, ipso facto, gives the book a rather stronger coffee-table flavour, is generally as first-class as we expect of him. Occasionally it is beyond adjectives, notably hls color, in which his flair for catching the play of light on snowy mountaln•tops, sheep's backs, birds' feathers, alpine flowers, boulders chalets, trees and other objects is impressively expressed." Craig McGregor regarded Gritscher as amongst a few who had "made the crucial breakthrough in Australian photography", and in In The Making records that another photographer commented "Helmut has a love affair with every subject he takes." He worked alongside, and as the equal of, significant Australian practitioners; photographs by Gritscher were purchased, with those of David Beal, David Moore, Lance Nelson and Richard Woldendorp in 1969 for the National Gallery of Victoria, Melbourne through the KODAK (Australasia) Pty Ltd Fund.

Exhibitions 
1969, December; group show with other works from the NGV collection by David Beal, David Moore, Lance Nelson and Richard Woldendorp, National Gallery of Victoria.

Publications

Books 
 
 
 
Gritscher, H., & New South Wales. (1970). New South Wales, Australia: Professional ski race, Mount Kosciusko. Sydney, N.S.W.: New South Wales Dept. of Tourism.

Contributor

Magazine articles 
Elyne Mitchell, with photographs by Helmut Gritscher, 'The Dream That Is Mount Townsend,' In Walkabout. Vol. 32 No. 6 (1 June 1966), p. 16-19, Australian Geographical Society.

References 

Austrian photojournalists
Photography in Australia
1933 births
2015 deaths
Sports photographers
Landscape photographers